The SPL Keski-Pohjanmaan piiri (Central Ostrobothnia Football Association) is one of the 12 district organisations of the Football Association of Finland. It administers lower tier football in Central Ostrobothnia.

Background 

Suomen Palloliitto Keski-Pohjanmaan piiri, commonly referred to as SPL Keski-Pohjanmaan piiri or SPL Keski-Pohjanmaa, is the governing body for football in Central Ostrobothnia. The organisation was established on 25 November 1945 and had 57 different clubs with 350 teams and 4,75 registered players in 2010. Based in Kokkola, the Association's Director is Kari Mars.

Member clubs

League Competitions 
SPL Keski-Pohjanmaan piiri run the following league competitions:

Men's Football
 Division 3 - Kolmonen  -  one section
 Division 4 - Nelonen  -  one section
 Division 5 - Vitonen  -  one sections
 Division 6 - Kutonen  -  two sections

Ladies Football
 Division 3 - Kolmonen  -  one section

Footnotes

References

External links 
 SPL Keski-Pohjanmaan piiri Official Website 

K
Sports organizations established in 1945